Padre Pio: Between Heaven and Earth is a 2000 Italian television movie directed by Giulio Base and starring Michele Placido in the title role. The film is based on real life events of Roman Catholic friar and later Saint, Padre Pio.

Plot

Based on the historical records and the personal testimony of his fellow friars, this is the amazing true story of the life of the famous stigmatic monk, St. Padre Pio, a contemporary saint who died in 1968. Blessed with incredible spiritual gifts, including healing, bi-location, reading of souls and the stigmatic wounds, Padre Pio was a powerful witness for Christ, and a great spiritual guide to countless souls for over fifty years. Filmed on location in Italy, starring Michele Placido in a moving performance, this film tells the whole story of the beloved monk from San Giovanni Rotondo, a place where millions of pilgrims now go annually to visit Padre Pio's grave.

Cast 

 Michele Placido as Pio
 Barbora Bobulova as Emilia
  Fabio Camilli as Dr. Guglielmo Sanguinetti
 Rocco Papaleo as  Friar Nicola
  Franco Trevisi as  Father  Elia
  Lucio Allocca  as  Father  Agostino
  Francesco Dominedò as Father  Antonio
 Marco Messeri as  Father Benedetto
 Sydne Rome as  Barbara Ward
 Riccardo Garrone as Eminency
 Mariano Rigillo as  Father  Gemelli
 Franco Interlenghi as Father  Graziano
  Massimo Bellinzoni as  Michele
  Francesca Gamba as  Alida
 Luigi Diberti as  Professor Bignami
 Pietro De Silva as  Father  Tommaso 
 Giovanni Lombardo Radice as  Pope Pius XII

See also
Padre Pio: Miracle Man (2000)
Padre Pio (film) (2022)

References

External links

2000 television films
2000 films
Italian television films
2000 biographical drama films
Films set in Italy
Italian biographical drama films
Films about religion
Films directed by Giulio Base
Films scored by Ennio Morricone
Cultural depictions of Pope Pius XII
2000s Italian films